The shrew-faced squirrel (Rhinosciurus laticaudatus), also known as the long-nosed squirrel, is a species of rodent in the family Sciuridae. It is monotypic within the genus Rhinosciurus. It is found in forests in Peninsular Malaysia (possibly also in adjacent southern Thailand), Singapore, Sumatra and Borneo. This peculiar, terrestrial squirrel mainly feeds on insects and earthworms. It quite closely resembles a Tupaia treeshrew in appearance, but the shrew-faced squirrel can be recognized by its shorter gape, and shorter and more bushy tail.

References

Thorington, R. W. Jr. and R. S. Hoffman. 2005. Family Sciuridae. pp. 754–818 in Mammal Species of the World a Taxonomic and Geographic Reference. D. E. Wilson and D. M. Reeder eds. Johns Hopkins University Press, Baltimore.

Shrew-faced Squirrel
Mammals of Borneo
Mammals of Brunei
Rodents of Indonesia
Rodents of Malaysia
Rodents of Singapore
Rodents of Thailand
Shrew-faced Squirrel
Taxonomy articles created by Polbot
Taxa named by Salomon Müller